Last of the Duanes may refer to:

Last of the Duanes (novel), a novel written in 1913 by Zane Grey and published in its original form in 1996
The Last of the Duanes (1919 film), an American film directed by J. Gordon Edwards
The Last of the Duanes (1924 film), an American film directed by Lynn Reynolds
The Last of the Duanes (1930 film), an American film directed by Alfred L. Werker
Last of the Duanes (1941 film), an American film directed by James Tinling

See also
 The Lone Star Ranger, novel by Zane Grey published in 1915 based in part on Last of the Duanes